Sam Cooke is the debut studio album by American singer-songwriter Sam Cooke, released on Keen Records in early 1958. The backing band is the Bumps Blackwell Orchestra.

Track listing
Side 1
 "You Send Me" (Sam Cooke, originally credited to L.C. Cook) – 2:41
 "The Lonesome Road" (Gene Austin, Nathaniel Shilkret) – 2:31
 "Tammy" (Jay Livingston, Ray Evans) – 3:30
 "Ol' Man River" (Jerome Kern, Oscar Hammerstein II) – 2:39
 "Moonlight in Vermont" (John Blackburn, Karl Suessdorf) – 2:40
 "Canadian Sunset" (Eddie Heywood, Norman Gimbel) – 2:57
Side 2
"Summertime" (DuBose Heyward, George Gershwin) – 2:25
 "Around the World" (Harold Adamson, Victor Young) – 1:58
 "Ain't Misbehavin'" (Andy Razaf, Fats Waller, Harry Brooks) – 2:05
 "The Bells of St. Mary" (A. Emmett Adams, Douglas Furber) – 2:17
 "So Long" (Remus Harris, Russ Morgan, Irving Melsher) – 2:38
 "Danny Boy" (Frederic Weatherly) – 2:16
 "That Lucky Old Sun" (Beasley Smith, Haven Gillespie) – 2:19

Personnel
On "You Send Me" and "Summertime"
Clifton White, René Hall – guitar
Ted Brinson – bass guitar
Earl Palmer – drums
Lee Gotch, The Pied Pipers – backing vocals

Charts

Weekly charts

Notes 

Sam Cooke albums
1958 debut albums
Albums produced by Robert Blackwell
Keen Records albums